José Cabrera (born 19 March 1987) is a Mexican former professional boxer who competed from 2004 to 2014. He challenged for the WBO super flyweight title in 2012.

Professional career
On 21 November 2009 Cabrera beat Jovanny Soto to win the NABF super flyweight title in Nuevo Laredo, Tamaulipas, Mexico.

References

External links
 

Sportspeople from Tampico, Tamaulipas
Boxers from Tamaulipas
Super-flyweight boxers
1987 births
Living people
Mexican male boxers